Myrtecaine (Nopoxamine), sold as a combination product with diethylamine salicylate under the trade name Algesal and Algésal Suractivé among others, is a local anaesthetic in the form of a topical cream, or with laurilsulfate in rubefacient preparations. It is used to treat muscle strains, tendinitis or ligament sprains and joint pain. It is a surface anaesthetic, adds to the analgesic and anti-inflammatory actions of diethylamine salicylate by facilitating its penetration. Also myrtecaine has a muscle relaxant effect.

References 

Local anesthetics
Diethylamino compounds